South Otselic is a hamlet in Chenango County, New York, United States. South Otselic has a post office with ZIP code 13155, which opened on April 17, 1830.

References

Hamlets in Chenango County, New York
Hamlets in New York (state)

South Otselic is a hamlet in Chenango County, New York, United States. The community is located along New York State Route 26 14.6 miles (23.5 km) west of Sherburne. South Otselic has a post office with ZIP code 13155, which opened on April 17, 1830.[2][3] 
South Otselic is the home of a New York State Fish Hatchery.

The hamlet was settled around 1800 by settlers mostly from Connecticut and Massachusetts.
By the last quarter of the 19th century the hamlet was a prosperous and growing settlement.
In 1875, the hamlet boasted a tannery, two churches, two hotels, seven stores, a photography gallery, a butter and cheese factory, a cooper, a grain mill, a sawmill, and a rope and line braiding factory. The Mammoth was a large store owned by Frank Cox that drew customers from all over Central New York.